Paul Martin (born 17 March 1967) is a Scottish politician who served as Member of the Scottish Parliament (MSP) for the Glasgow Provan constituency from 2011 to 2016. A member of the Scottish Labour Party, he previously represented Glasgow Springburn from 1999 to 2011.

Early life and education

Paul Martin was born in 1967 in Glasgow, the son of Michael Martin (1945–2018), a sheet metal worker, and Mary Martin (née McLay), an assembly worker. His parents had married the previous year. Michael was a member of the Labour Party and would go on to become a Member of Parliament (MP), Speaker of the House of Commons and life peer. Paul was educated at All Saints Roman Catholic Secondary School and Barmulloch College in Glasgow.

Political career 
At the age of 26, Martin became a Glasgow District Councillor for the Royston ward following a council by-election in December 1993. He was first elected to the Scottish Parliament in May 1999 as MSP for Glasgow Springburn. He served as parliamentary aide to the Lord Advocate from 2001 to 2007 and to the Shadow Cabinet Secretary for Justice from 2007 to 2009. Following the 2007 Scottish Parliament election, he was appointed as Scottish Labour's spokesperson for community safety, and as parliamentary business manager on 28 October 2009.

In 2016, Martin sought re-election to a fifth term in the Scottish Parliament but lost his seat to the Scottish National Party's Ivan McKee by 4,783 votes. After losing his seat, he took up the role of general manager and collector at the Merchants House of Glasgow.

Personal life

Martin is married to Marie (née McGarvie) and has two daughters, one named Abbie.

References

External links 
 

|-

1967 births
Living people
Labour MSPs
Members of the Scottish Parliament for Glasgow constituencies
Members of the Scottish Parliament 1999–2003
Members of the Scottish Parliament 2003–2007
Members of the Scottish Parliament 2007–2011
Members of the Scottish Parliament 2011–2016
People educated at All Saints Roman Catholic Secondary School
People from Springburn
Sons of life peers